"Ampun Bang Jago" is an electronic dance music (EDM) single by Indonesians Jonathan Dorongpangalo and Everly Salikara, known by their stage names as Tian Storm and Everslkr, respectively. It was not initially created as an EDM, but the rising trend in Indonesia caused them to convert the song into one. The song became viral, becoming a frequently-used song on TikTok, and received international popularity. The unprecedented legacy prompted the duo to create a remix, "Ampun Bang Jago 2".

Background and lyrics 
Jonathan Dorongpangalo and Everly Salikara, known by their stage names as Tian Storm and Everslkr, respectively, are musicians from Bitung, a city in North Sulawesi. Dorongpangalo conceived the idea for "Ampun Bang Jago" as a political satire song that pokes fun at the Indonesian authorities, concerning the power struggle between the people and them, "because my life motto is concede to win." The song is made under the name of musical collective Bassgilano, with whom the duo joined in 2016.

The first draft of "Ampun Bang Jago" was not EDM, but a set of sentences as a way for Dorongpangalo and Salikara to vent their feelings on people underestimating them. After being belittled by fellow musicians due to fierce rivalry, they converted the draft into EDM, a genre that aligns with Indonesia's rising musical trend.

Popularity on TikTok 
As a result of the duo's decision to modernize their draft, the song became viral, and became a signature song in the duo's village's "Disko Tanah" community. Not long later, the song became an available track for TikTok users to use on their videos. "Ampun Bang Jago" is their second viral song that is also used on TikTok, after "Anjing Kacili" ('Little Dog'), although Dorongpangalo did not expect the hype. It was also used by protesters during the Indonesia omnibus law protests. In addition, the song gifted Dorongpangalo and Salikara a partnership with a "famous" record label in 2017. As of "Ampun Bang Jago", the duo had created 60 songs, divided into five albums. Acknowledging the existence,  2020 also partially used the song.

The song also received international popularity. On 8 October 2020, the TikTok account of football club West Ham United F.C. made a video using the song, with an eponymous caption. As of 13 October 2020, it garnered 1.2 million views and 110.1 thousand likes, making it the most-viewed video from the account.

Myanmar Coup d’État
The song received global attention after a 26-year-old exercise instructor named Khine Hnin Wai filmed an aerobics video in Naypyidaw, amid the 2021 Myanmar coup d'état. As "Ampun Bang Jago" climaxes in the background, the situation behind her became much more tense. Hnin Wai appears to not realize what was happening behind, hinting a political satire, although she denied the claim, saying that she was only dancing for a fitness competition. The video was described by NPR as surreal. Posted on her Facebook, the video became viral and was met with mixed opinions: while its symbolism was lauded, Myanmar military supporters thought of the video as an insult. Its style has been compared to the television series Black Mirror (2011—2019) and the works or Slovenian philosopher Slavoj Žižek. It has also been widely used on Reddit, with Hnin Wai being photoshopped to photos of various political massacres.
Responding to the video, Dorongpangalo hoped that "Ampun Bang Jago" proves to international audiences that Indonesian songs—particularly those from eastern Indonesia—can be enjoyable too, and for Indonesian singers to continue their works "to enliven the homeland's musical reputation."

Due to the popularity, upon requests from fans, and under the will to collaborate with fellow Bitung content creators, the duo announced a sequel, "Ampun Bang Jago 2". It features a different audio mixing style; for example, the sound drop at the start of the song are replaced by sirens. Because of the easiness, it was made within three days. There are also changes to the lyrics, with a plot twist at the end, saying "Tapi bo'ong", meaning "It's a lie". Dorongpangalo stated that the sequel is merely "for fun" and not having much sarcastic elements as its predecessor.

Music video 
The music video for "Ampun Bang Jago", published on YouTube on 12 September 2020, is set at an abandoned field and a bus terminal. Endrico Geraldo serves as the director, cinematographer, and editor, while Piaw is the choreographer. Equipment were borrowed from TSstudio. In addition to the duo themselves, the video stars Piaw, Egha, Gita, Nando Kohler, Marsel Kasengke, Doddi Metuak, and Silvester Masihor. Additional credits were directed towards Christian Sarante, Josia Walone, and Andhika Makawekes. The plot concerns several troubled people who are fighting and chasing each other, intercut with a montage of three girls dancing. Soon, one of the men involved is threatened to be shot. His team tries blocking their nemesis from attacking him, but to no avail, with the man shot.

The lyrics video for "Ampun Bang Jago 2" premiered on YouTube on 4 February 2021. It features Dorongpangalo and Salikara, wearing masks, DJ-ing at the rooftop of a pink-coloured metropolitan building. The music video for "Ampun Bang Jago 2" is set to be released sometime in the future. The music video, specifically, is a partnership with the Bitung Police, as well as Bitung content creator Indra Dunggio, known by his pseudonym as Preman Pinokalan (Pinokalan Thug).

References 

2020 songs
Electronic dance music songs
Indonesian songs
Indonesian-language songs
Political songs
Satirical songs
Internet memes introduced in 2020